The wyvern (sometimes spelled wivern) is a type of biped dragon often a pointed tail which was said to be poisonous. 

The wyvern in its various forms is important in heraldry, frequently appearing as a mascot of schools and athletic teams (chiefly in the United States, United Kingdom, and Canada). It is a popular creature in European literature, mythology, and folklore. Today, it is often used in fantasy literature and video games. The wyvern in heraldry and folklore is rarely fire-breathing, unlike other dragons.

Etymology 
According to the Oxford English Dictionary, the word is a development of Middle English wyver (attested fourteenth century), from Anglo-French wivre (cf. French guivre and vouivre), which originate from Latin vīpera, meaning "viper", "adder", or "asp". The concluding "–n" had been added by the beginning of the 17th century, when John Guillim in 1610 describes the "wiverne" as a creature that "partake[s] of a Fowle in the Wings and Legs ... and doth resemble a Serpent in the Taile". John Gibbon in 1682 emphasises that it "hath but two Legs".

Conversely, medievalist William Sayers proposes a more complex origin for the term.  He notes that the Anglo-French guivre and its Middle English derivative ceased to retain the original sense of "venomous snake" after the Latin term was re-introduced into medieval Latin, freeing them up to take an alternate meaning. Adducing another meaning of wiver (this time Old English) and guivre, "light javelin", and noting partial resemblances between the size and shape of javelins and snakes, plus the later medieval era's increasing use of heavy armor and decreasing use of light javelins, he proposes that the concepts of "venomous snake" and "light javelin" were melded to produce a new term for a previously unimagined concept of flying snake, a kind of dragon.

History 

The concept of winged snakes, mythical creatures similar to wyverns, is common in cultures around the Mediterranean, with a notable example being the Egyptian goddess Wadjet. The oldest creatures outright referred to as "winged dragons" are Helios's chariot steeds, which aid Medea.

Distinction from other dragons 

Since the sixteenth century, in English, Scottish, and Irish heraldry, the key difference has been that a wyvern has two legs, whereas other dragons have four. This distinction is not commonly observed in the heraldry of other European countries, where two-legged dragon creatures are simply called dragons.

In modern fiction 

The wyvern frequently features in modern fantasy fiction, though its first literary appearances may have been in medieval bestiaries.

In heraldry 

The wyvern is a frequent charge in English heraldry and vexillology, also occasionally appearing as a supporter or crest.

A wyvern is typically depicted resting upon its legs and tail, but may be depicted with its claws in the air and only supported by its tail. On occasion, a wyvern may be depicted as wingless and with its tail nowed.

A white (Argent) wyvern formed the crest of the Borough of Leicester as recorded at the heraldic visitation of Leicestershire in 1619: "A wyvern sans legs argent strewed with wounds gules, wings expanded ermine." The term "sans legs" may not imply that the wyvern was "without legs", rather than its legs are not depicted, being hidden or folded under. This was adopted by the Midland Railway in 1845 when it became the crest of its unofficial coat of arms. The company asserted that the "wyvern was the standard of the Kingdom of Mercia", and that it was "a quartering in the town arms of Leicester". However, in 1897 the Railway Magazine noted that there appeared "to be no foundation that the wyvern was associated with the Kingdom of Mercia". It has been associated with Leicester since the time of Thomas, 2nd Earl of Lancaster and Leicester (c. 1278–1322), the most powerful lord in the Midlands, who used it as his personal crest.

A green Wyvern stands in the emblem of the ancient and historical Umbrian city of Terni, the dragon is called by the citizens with the name of Thyrus. A sable wyvern on a white background with endorsed wings forms the coat of arms of the Tilley family.

The arms of the Worshipful Society of Apothecaries depict a wyvern, symbolising disease, being overcome by Apollo, symbolising medicine.

Wyvern Zilant is depicted on the coat of arms of the city of Kazan, the capital of the Republic of Tatarstan.

As a logo or mascot 

The wyvern is a popular commercial logo or mascot, especially in Wales and what was once the West Country Kingdom of Wessex, but also in Herefordshire and Worcestershire, as the rivers Wye and Severn run through Hereford and Worcester respectively. A local radio station was formerly called Wyvern FM. Vauxhall Motors had a model in its range in the 1950s called the Wyvern. The Westland Wyvern was a British single-seat carrier-based multi-role strike aircraft built by Westland Aircraft that served in the 1950s, seeing active service in the 1956 Suez Crisis.

The wyvern is a frequent mascot of athletic teams, colleges and universities, particularly in the United Kingdom and the United States, and was the mascot of the former Korea Baseball Organization team SK Wyverns, established in 2000, King's College, within the University of Queensland, and the Japanese basketball team, the Passlab Yamagata Wyverns of the Japanese B.League.

The wyvern is also the mascot of the 51st Operations Support Squadron at Osan Air Base, with the motto: "breathin' fire!"

A wyvern is depicted on the unit crest of the USAF 31st Fighter Wing.

A wyvern is featured on the club crests of both Leyton Orient F.C. and Carlisle United F.C.

A wyvern is featured as the team mascot for Woodbridge College in Woodbridge, Ontario, Canada.

A wyvern is the mascot of Quinsigamond Community College in Worcester, Massachusetts.

A wyvern is the logo of LLVM, the compiler infrastructure project.

A wyvern is the logo of the Swiss chocolate manufacturer Lindt.

A wyvern is the emblem of East London Rugby Football Club.

Wyvern is the a nickname of a fictional aircraft in the Ace Combat series: the X-02 Wyvern.

A Wyvern is the emblem of Old Wesley R.F.C.

Examples

See also 

 Basilisk
 Cockatrice
 European dragon
 Lindworm
 White dragon

References

External links 

European dragons
Medieval European legendary creatures
Mythological hybrids